Las Palmas (Spanish for "The Palms") is a former unincorporated community in Fresno County, California, now incorporated in Fresno. It lies at an elevation of 331 feet (101 m).

References

Neighborhoods in Fresno, California